The Six Healing Sounds or Liù Zì Jué is one of the common forms of Chinese qigong, and involves the coordination of movement and breathing patterns with specific sounds.

History
The term Liù Zì Jué first appears in the book On Caring for the Health of the Mind and Prolonging the Life Span written by Tao Hongjing of the Southern and Northern Dynasties (420 - 589). A leading figure of the Maoshan School of Taoism, Tao was renowned for his profound knowledge of Traditional Chinese medicine. "One has only one way for inhalation but six for exhalation" he writes in the book.

Zou Pu'an of the Song Dynasty (960 - 1279) was a major contributor in terms of theory and practice to the transmission of the exercise through his book The Supreme Knack for Health Preservation - Six-Character Approach to Breathing Exercises. 

No body movements accompanied the Liù Zì Jué exercises until the Ming Dynasty (1386 - 1644) when Hu Wenhuan and Gao Lian wrote books on the subject. For instance they both included in their books the summary of Liù Zì Jué for dispelling diseases and prolonging the life span, which combines controlled breathing with physical exercises.

There are a number of schools of exercise which incorporate elements of Liù Zì Jué, including Yi Jin Jing, Ba Gua Zhang and Da Yan Gong, but the sounds are used as an aid to physical exercises in these dynamic Qigong, which is different from Liù Zì Jué. An authoritative work on the subject is Ma Litang's Liù Zì Jué Health and Fitness Exercises for clinical application.

The theoretical basis of the Liù Zì Jué exercises is in line with the ancient theories intrinsic to traditional Chinese medicine of the Five Elements and the Five Solid Viscera. They tend to be on common ground on such issues as mouth forms and pronunciation methods, and the direction of body movements and mind follow the inner circulation law of the meridians.

The sounds/sections

  xū - 'deep sigh' or 'hiss' - Level the Liver Qi
  hē - 'yawn' or 'laughing sound' - Supplement the Heart Qi
  hū - 'to sigh,' 'to exhale,' or 'to call' - Cultivate [or Shore Up] the Spleen/Pancreas Qi
  sī - 'to rest' - Supplement the Lung Qi
  chuī - 'to blow out,' 'to blast,' or 'to puff' - Supplement the Kidney Qi
  xī - 'mirthful' - Regulate the Triple Burner Qi

All syllables are pronounced on a level tone - the so-called first tone (regardless of the dictionary pronunciation of each word); typically all but the fifth sound are sustained - the fifth sound may be sustained, or pronounced quickly and forcefully.

See also
 Ba Duan Jin
 Neigong
 Qigong
 Traditional Chinese medicine
 Yangsheng (Daoism)
 Yi Jin Jing

References

 TU Ren-Shun; "Effect of Practicing Health Qigong-Liu Zi Jue on Endocrine System During Menopause"; Xiyuan Hospital of China, Academy of T.C.M. (Beijing 100091)
 TU Ren-Shun; "Effect of Practicing Health Qigong-Liu Zi Jue on Brain Electrical Power Spectra for Old and Middle-aged People"; Xiyuan Hospital of China, Academy of T.C.M. (Beijing 100091)
 YU Ping, ZHU Ying-Qi, SHEN Zhong-Yuan; "The Experimental Research of the Effect of Health Qigong-Liu Zi Jue Exercise on the Human Lung Function"; Shanghai Qigong Institute (Shanghai 200032)
 Cathrine Despeux; "The Six Healing Breaths" in "Daoist Body Cultivation" 2006 p. 37 - 68 incl. bibliography 
 A guide to perform the Six Healing Sounds can be found at this external link
 List articles about  Liu Zi Jue on neigong.net
 A collection of different six healing sound videos on Qigong Journal

Qigong
Chinese martial arts
Chinese words and phrases
Taoist practices